Daniel Patrick Höhl (born 25 December 1985) is a Danish professional ice hockey forward who currently plays for Hvidovre Ligahockey.

Career
This Danish player came to Skellefteå in Sweden in 2002 after playing with the Danish Elite team Rungstedt/Nordsjaelland. He has been a regular on Denmark's junior national team and played with Peter Regin.

International
Höhl played with the Danish national team at the Under-18 level, and was with the team B group Winner at Latvia in 2004. He later played for the Under-20 team.

External links

1985 births
Living people
Danish ice hockey forwards